Rhamphomyia simplex is a species of dance flies, in the fly family Empididae. It has a limited distribution. It is known from Ireland, east to Germany and from Sweden, Finland and north-west Russia.

References

External links
Fauna Europaea

Rhamphomyia
Asilomorph flies of Europe
Insects described in 1849